Paul Bryan may refer to:
 Paul Bryan (musician) (born 1967), American musician
 Paul Bryan (politician) (1913–2004), British politician

See also 
 Paul Bryant (disambiguation)